"Fall in Love" is a song co-written and recorded by American country music artist Kenny Chesney.  It was released in March 1995 as the lead single from his album All I Need to Know. The song became Chesney's first Top 10 hit, peaking at number 6 in both the United States and Canada.  Chesney wrote the song with Buddy Brock and Kim Williams.

Critical reception
Larry Flick, of Billboard magazine reviewed the song unfavorably saying that Chesney "seems somewhat straightjacketed by this sunny pop song." He tells the label to let Chesney "sink his teeth into some hardcore country."

Music video
The music video was directed by Steven T. Miller and R. Brad Murano, and premiered on CMT on March 24, 1995, when CMT named it a "Hot Shot".

Chart positions
"Fall in Love" debuted at number 66 on the U.S. Billboard Hot Country Singles & Tracks for the week of April 1, 1995.

Year-end charts

References

1995 singles
Kenny Chesney songs
Songs written by Buddy Brock
Songs written by Kenny Chesney
Songs written by Kim Williams (songwriter)
Song recordings produced by Barry Beckett
BNA Records singles
1995 songs